Alva is an unincorporated community in north central Crook County, Wyoming, United States. It lies along WYO 24, 34.9 miles north of the town of Sundance, the county seat of Crook County and 9.7 miles away from Hulett. Its elevation is 3,993 feet (1,217 m), and it is located at  (44.694707, -104.441342). Although Alva is unincorporated, it has a post office, with the ZIP code of 82711. Population is 50.

Public education in the community of Alva is provided by Crook County School District #1.

Climate
According to the Köppen Climate Classification system, Alva has a semi-arid climate, abbreviated "BSk" on climate maps.

References

Unincorporated communities in Crook County, Wyoming
Unincorporated communities in Wyoming